O'Neall is a surname, and may refer to:

 Charles F. O'Neall (1875–1929), American real estate agent and Democrat politician
 John Belton O'Neall (1793–1863), American judge
 John H. O'Neall (1838–1907), American lawyer and politician

See also
 Neall
 O'Neill